The 2013–14 M*League Division 1 was the eighth season of top-flight football in Northern Marianas Islands. The League was won by IFC Wild Bills.

References

Marianas Soccer League seasons
North
football
football